Brian Gottfried and Raúl Ramirez were the defending champions and won in the final 6–3, 6–3 against Tian Viljoen and Danie Visser.

Seeds

Draw

Final

Top half

Bottom half

References
 1983 Congoleum Classic Doubles Draw

Congoleum Classic Doubles